Science Seekers is a trilogy of science-related educational video games for the Windows and Macintosh platforms, developed and published by Tom Snyder Productions. The American Museum of Natural History collaborated in the series' development and got a grant from NASA. The series consists of Science Seekers: Hidden in Rocks, Science Seekers: Endangered Species and Science Seekers: Safe Water.

Gameplay
The player is part of a team called the "Science Seekers", who are headquartered in the American Museum of Natural History in New York City. In each game, they will be assigned a mission, which videos and real-life scientists will explain its nature and the steps they must take to accomplish it, making use of collected data and methods throughout.

Development

Educational goals
The series demonstrates how to solve problems in real life with science. The content consists of videos and clear summaries to give children motivation, evaluation and effort towards teamwork. Teacher's guides are provided to allow tutors to give revision sessions. Students can use the content to conduct scientific experiments, do scientific research and learn about technology. They also show the dangers and experiences of natural phenomena.

Reception

Awards

|-
| 2001
| Science Seekers 
| CODiE Award for Best School Based Secondary Education Software
|
|}

References

External links
Official website

2000 video games
MacOS games
Windows games
Children's educational video games
Science educational video games
Video games developed in the United States
Video game franchises introduced in 2000